Gerard "Jed" O'Toole (born 14 December 1962) was one of the original members of Frankie Goes to Hollywood alongside his brother, bassist Mark.

Jed played on the original demo of Relax, which led to the band's signing and became their biggest hit. However, before recording of the studio version, Jed left the band making way for his cousin, relatively inexperienced guitarist Brian Nash. This led to the final guitar on the studio recording being played by studio musician Steve Lipson, while Nash developed his skills and played on other tracks on the band's debut album.

Jed re-joined the band for its worldwide tours in 1984 and 1987.

For the band's 2004 reunion, Jed replaced Nash as the band's lead guitarist.

References 

English rock guitarists
Frankie Goes to Hollywood members
Living people
1962 births